Cosmosoma regia is a moth of the subfamily Arctiinae. It was described by William Schaus in 1894. It is found in Venezuela Costa Rica and Peru.

References

regia
Moths described in 1894